The People's Choice (previously Christchurch 2021) is a centre-left political ticket that contests elections for the Christchurch City Council, and the Canterbury Regional Council (Environment Canterbury) in Christchurch, New Zealand.

History
The People's Choice was founded as Christchurch 2021 to contest the 1992 local body elections after the amalgamation of several smaller councils into a larger Christchurch City Council in 1989, and brought under one umbrella Labour local candidates with independent centre-left and left.

The ticket has an association with the New Zealand Labour Party, and although it has never run a mayoral candidate under its modern title, it tends to support centre-left mayors both on council and during election campaigns.

In 2016, the People's Choice won all three seats it contested in the Christchurch ward of the Canterbury Regional Council. In 2019, it won four urban seats in the Canterbury Regional Council.

During the 2019 Christchurch local elections, People's Choice candidates won seven seats in the Christchurch City Council.

Policies and platform
The People's Choice sits to the left of the centre-right Independent Citizens grouping on council, and supports such initiatives as expanding social housing, making pool entry free for children and their caregivers, and opposing the sale of council-owned assets. In its policy manifesto, the ticket also voices support for a rental warrant of fitness and "supporting Māori economic development through partnership with Ngāi Tahu and other iwi".

References

Political groupings in New Zealand
Politics of Christchurch